Critical Reviews in Oncogenesis is a quarterly scientific journal published by Begell House covering the field of oncology. The editor-in-chief is Ragnhild A. Lothe.

External links 
 

Oncology journals
Quarterly journals
English-language journals
Begell House academic journals
Review journals
Publications established in 1989